The Police Officer's Wife is a 2013 German drama film directed by Philip Gröning. It was screened in the main competition section at the 70th Venice International Film Festival where it won the Special Jury Prize.

Cast
 Alexandra Finder as Christine Perkinger
 David Zimmerschied as Uwe Perkinger
 Pia Kleemann as Clara Perkinger
 Chiara Kleemann as Clara Perkinger
 Horst Rehberg
 Katharina Susewind
 Lars Rudolph

References

External links
 

2013 films
2013 drama films
German drama films
2010s German-language films
Venice Special Jury Prize winners
2010s German films